Line 1 of the Changsha Metro is a line of the Changsha Metro that runs across Changsha, from Kaifu District Government in the north to Shangshuangtang in the south.  It serves 20 stations over 23.55 km, and is coloured red on the system map. It first began operations on June 28, 2016.

History
The first phase of the line, spanning  from Kaifu District Government to Shangshuangtang, commenced construction work on December 26, 2010. Excavation work was completed in October 2015, and the section was opened on June 28, 2016.

Opening timeline

Stations

Rolling stock
Services on the line are provided by a fleet of 23 Type B train sets manufactured by CRRC Zhuzhou.

Future plans
A 5-station, 9.93 km long extension north to Caixia Road from Kaifu District Government began construction on October 16, 2020.

References

Changsha Metro lines
Railway lines opened in 2016
2016 establishments in China